Theodore Gourdin (March 20, 1764January 17, 1826) was a U.S. Representative from South Carolina.

Life
Born near Kingstree in the Province of South Carolina, Gourdin was educated in Charleston, and in Europe.  He owned a plantation, on which he enslaved people, in Moncks Corner, South Carolina.

Gourdin was elected as a Democratic-Republican to the Thirteenth Congress (March 4, 1813 – March 3, 1815).

After his term, he resumed agricultural pursuits.  He died in Pineville, South Carolina, January 17, 1826.  He was interred in Episcopal Cemetery, St. Stephen, South Carolina.

Sources

1764 births
1826 deaths
Democratic-Republican Party members of the United States House of Representatives from South Carolina
People from Kingstree, South Carolina